The Russian Liberation Movement was a movement in the Soviet Union that sought to create an anti-communist armed force during the Second World War that would topple Joseph Stalin's regime. The movement included Russians and other nationalities that lived in the Soviet Union and was then referred to as the Liberation Movement of the Peoples of Russia.

History 
The movement began spontaneously at the outbreak of the Soviet-German War in June 1941. White Russian émigrés, who were veterans of the White movement, began seeking sympathetic ears in the German Armed Forces (the Wehrmacht) and trying to find a means of creating armed units that would be used on the Eastern Front, such as the Russian Corps. Meanwhile, some captured Soviet officers switched sides, including General Andrey Vlasov. The German propaganda department began exploiting the idea of a non-existent Russian Liberation Army to encourage defections, printed up propaganda leaflets encouraging surrender and dropped them in Soviet zones.

The Russian National People's Army, formed in occupied Belarus, was under the command of two White émigrés, Sergei Nikitich Ivanov and Constantine Kromiadi and also had a considerable amount of emigres in its officer core. Later the émigrés were replaced by former Soviet Commanders Vladimir Boyarsky and Georgii Zhilenkov, since German officials dreaded the émigrés' influence on Soviet citizens. The unit, 8,000 men strong, managed to negotiate with Soviet partisans to reduce hostility and displeased the SS, which eventually disarmed the unit. The units were under German supervision and kept to a restricted size (often without being fully outfitted with heavy artillery), and two of them were disarmed because their loyalty was questioned.

The Russian anti-communist National Alliance of Russian Solidarists (NTS) was the only significant Russian group that tried to act outside all German sponsorship. That principle was declared in 1938 by Chairman Sergei Baidalakov, who said in the wake of the impending military conflict, "With whom do we go? The Russian conscience can have only one answer. Not with Stalin, not with foreign conquerors, but with the entire Russian people". The hope was to create an entirely-independent self-sufficient "third force" that would be anticommunist but also anti-Nazi and would be based on a grassroots partisan resistance movement. Shortly before the start of the invasion of the Soviet Union, it decided to close its offices on Axis-occupied territories and to go underground to avoid Axis infiltration. It also forbade its members from joining any German sponsored units, such as the Russian Corps in Serbia.

There was no united centre for the movement until the Committee for the Liberation of the Peoples of Russia was founded in November 1944, which officially announced its existence with the Prague Manifesto. The movement, led by General Vlasov, received a surprising groundswell of support with White émigrés, Soviet Eastern workers, and prisoners-of-war despite the apparent futility of the situation (Germany was already fighting on its own soil when the first Russian Liberation units were ready for deployment. The committee received the blessing of Metropolitan Anastasy of the Russian Orthodox Church Outside Russia as well as the Paris Exarchate.

Several armed groups that were already fighting, such as the Russian Corps of General Boris Shteifon, the "Battle Group" of White General Tourkoul and the Cossacks of Ataman Helmuth von Pannwitz submitted themselves to the committee's command, but the turn of events prevented them from ever being de facto incorporated into the Russian Liberation Army. Others, such as General Pyotr Krasnov and several Ukrainian armed groups refused to submit to Vlasov and denounced him publicly.

References

 (1994) The Mission of the Russian Emigration, M.V. Nazarov. Moscow: Rodnik. 
 (1986) Novopokolentsy, B. Prianishnikoff. Silver Spring, MD. 

Germany–Soviet Union relations
Politics of the Soviet Union
Politics of World War II
White Russian emigration
Russian collaborators with Nazi Germany
Anti-communist organizations